Haystack Peak is a  mountain summit located in Juab County, Utah, United States.

Description
Haystack Peak is the second-highest summit in the Deep Creek Mountains which are a subset of the Great Basin Ranges, and it is set on land administered by the Bureau of Land Management. The Dugway Proving Ground is northeast of the peak and line parent Ibapah Peak is 1.5 mile to the southwest. Bristlecone pine can be found on the peak's slopes, as well as spruce, fir, and aspen. Precipitation runoff from the mountain's west slope drains into Sams Creek, the northwest slope drains into Indian Farm Creek, and the south slope is drained by Red Cedar Creek. This landform's toponym was officially adopted in 1974 by the U.S. Board on Geographic Names.

Climate
Haystack Peak is set in the Great Basin Desert which has hot summers and cold winters. The desert is an example of a cold desert climate as the desert's elevation makes temperatures cooler than lower elevation deserts. Due to the high elevation and aridity, temperatures drop sharply after sunset. Summer nights are comfortably cool. Winter highs are generally above freezing, and winter nights are bitterly cold, with temperatures often dropping well below freezing. Alpine climate characterizes the summit and highest slopes.

See also
 
 List of mountain peaks of Utah

References

External links
Haystack Peak: weather forecast

Mountains of Utah
Mountains of Juab County, Utah
North American 3000 m summits
Mountains of the Great Basin